Aarathi (Malayalam: ആരതി) is a 1981 Indian Malayalam film, directed by P. Chandrakumar and produced by Soorya Narayanan Potti. The film stars Sukumaran, Mala Aravindan, Ravi Menon and Seema in the lead roles. The film has musical score by M. B. Sreenivasan.

Cast
Sukumaran as Saimon
Mala Aravindan as Damu
Ravi Menon as Ravi
Seema as Aarathi
Vincent as Vijayan
Cochin Haneefa as Gangan
Sankaradi as Balan Menon
Jose Prakash as Major Prathapa Chandran 
Santhakumari as Nurse

Soundtrack
The music was composed by M. B. Sreenivasan and the lyrics were written by Sathyan Anthikkad.

References

External links
 

1981 films
1980s Malayalam-language films
Films directed by P. Chandrakumar